The women's 60 metres hurdles event  at the 2002 European Athletics Indoor Championships was held on March 2.

Medalists

Note: Glory Alozie of Spain originally won gold with 7.84, but was later disqualified as she was not yet eligible to compete for Spain after having switched allegiance from Nigeria.

Results

Heats
First 2 of each heat (Q) and the next 2 fastest (q) qualified for the final.

Final

References
Results

60 metres hurdles at the European Athletics Indoor Championships
60
2002 in women's athletics